Fale is an islet of the Fakaofo island group of Tokelau. The main settlement in the group is located on the island. As of 2018, 355 people lived on the islet.

References

 Map of Fakaofo Atoll

Islands of Tokelau
Pacific islands claimed under the Guano Islands Act
Fakaofo
Populated places in Tokelau